William Ryder (died 1432/33), of Totnes, Devon was an English politician.

He was a Member (MP) of the Parliament of England for Totnes in November 1414.

References

Year of birth missing
1430s deaths
English MPs November 1414
Members of the Parliament of England (pre-1707) for Totnes